New Wave Hot Dogs is the second studio album by American indie rock band Yo La Tengo, released in 1987 by record label Coyote.

Re-releases 
New Wave Hot Dogs was re-released by Coyote, along with President Yo La Tengo and the "Asparagus Song" single, on CD in 1989. It has also been re-released by City Slang and Matador.

Reception 

The album was described by Dave Henderson in a 1988 review in Underground magazine as "a fine album, a loveable set of tunes – all put together with the greatest of ease." AllMusic called it "a quantum leap over the sound of their debut".

Track listing
All songs written by Ira Kaplan except where noted.

Personnel
Ira Kaplan — guitars, vocals
Stephan Wichnewski — bass
Georgia Hubley — drums

Additional Personnel
Chris Stamey — guitar (tracks 4, 11)
Dave Rick — guitar (track 8)

References

External links 
 

1987 albums
Yo La Tengo albums